Robert Słaboń (born 15 September 1953) is a former international speedway rider from Poland.

Speedway career 
Słaboń reached the final of the Speedway World Championship in the 1979 Individual Speedway World Championship. He has twice won the bronze medal at the Polish Individual Speedway Championship.

He rode in the top tier of British Speedway, riding for Eastbourne Eagles.

World final appearances

Individual World Championship
 1979 –  Chorzów, Silesian Stadium – 15th – 2pts

World Team Cup
 1979 –  London, White City Stadium (with Piotr Pyszny / Zenon Plech / Marek Cieślak / Andrzej Tkocz) – 4th – 11pts (2)

References 

1953 births
Living people

Polish speedway riders
Eastbourne Eagles riders
Sportspeople from Wrocław